Homework Machine is the solo debut album of Zild Benitez, the frontman and bassist of IV of Spades. It was released on August 6, 2020 under Warner Music Philippines.

Background
On June 12, 2020, Benitez released "Sinungaling" with its music video on YouTube. Few weeks later, he also released "Dila", along with its music video on July 9, 2020.

On August 1, 2020, he posted a picture of the track listing of his solo debut album on Twitter, also announcing the release date of the album on August 6.

With the release of the album, he also released the music video for "Habulan", making it the third single from the album. On September 12, 2020, he released the animated music video of "Alalahanin". He also released the music video for "Takbo Ng Panahon" on October 3, 2020.

Track listing

Accolades

References

2020 debut albums